Richard Lee LeCounte III (born September 11, 1998) is an American football safety for the Los Angeles Rams of the National Football League (NFL). He played college football at Georgia.

Early years
LeCounte attended Liberty County High School in Hinesville, Georgia. As a senior, he was named the 2016 Savannah Morning News Male Athlete of the Year and Football Defensive Player of the Year. LeCounte played in the 2017 U.S. Army All-American Bowl. A five star recruit, he committed to the University of Georgia to play college football.

College career
As a true freshman at Georgia in 2017, LeCounte played in 10 games and had 15 tackles. As a sophomore in 2018, he started 13 of 14 games and led the team with 74 tackles and one interception. As a junior in 2019, LeCounte started all 14 and had 61 tackles and four interceptions. He returned to Georgia for his senior year in 2020, rather than enter the 2020 NFL Draft.

Professional career

Cleveland Browns
On May 1, 2021, LeCounte was selected by the Cleveland Browns with the 169th overall pick in the 2021 NFL Draft. He signed his four-year rookie contract on May 13, 2021.

On October 3, 2022, LeCounte was waived by the Browns and re-signed to the practice squad. He was released on October 19.

Los Angeles Rams
On December 14, 2022, LeCounte signed with the practice squad of the Los Angeles Rams. He signed a reserve/futures contract on January 9, 2023.

References

External links
Georgia Bulldogs bio

1998 births
Living people
People from Liberty County, Georgia
Players of American football from Georgia (U.S. state)
American football safeties
Georgia Bulldogs football players
Cleveland Browns players
Los Angeles Rams players